Daniel Parrish (born July 4, 1983 in Tallahassee, Florida) is a former National Football League offensive lineman. He went to Florida A&M. He was signed by the Jacksonville Jaguars as an undrafted free agent. He later signed with the New York Giants.

External links
nfl.com player profile

1983 births
Living people
Florida A&M Rattlers football players
Jacksonville Jaguars players
New York Giants players